Matthew Cooper (born 1 July 1994) is a Scottish professional footballer who plays for Elgin City, as a defender.

He began his career with Inverness Caledonian Thistle.

Early and personal life
Cooper was born in Macduff and attended Banff Academy.
Cooper played for Macduff Lions Boys Club and Deveronvale, and also represented Aberdeenshire, North of Scotland Regional and Scotland Schoolboys National U18's.

Career
Cooper began his career as a youth player for Macduff Lions Boys Club before moving onto Deveronvale and Aberdeen. He joined the senior team of Inverness Caledonian Thistle at the start of the 2012–13 season, going on to make his senior debut for Inverness in the Scottish Premier League on 22 December 2012.

After two years at the club, Cooper was released by Inverness and was among three players to join Elgin City.

Career statistics

References

1994 births
Living people
People educated at Banff Academy
People from Banff and Buchan
Scottish footballers
Deveronvale F.C. players
Aberdeen F.C. players
Inverness Caledonian Thistle F.C. players
Elgin City F.C. players
Scottish Premier League players
Scottish Professional Football League players
Association football defenders
Footballers from Aberdeenshire